The 2009–10 Citycell Bangladesh League started on 25 October 2009. 13 teams will compete with each other on a home and away basis.

The third edition of Bangladeshi football in the professional era was renamed from B League to Bangladesh League in order to combat suggestions that it is a second-tier league.

Clubs

 Abahani Limited, Dhaka
 Mohammedan Sporting Club, Dhaka
 Sheikh Russel KC, Dhaka
 Brothers Union, Dhaka
 Mohammedan Sporting Club, Chittagong
 Farashganj SC, Dhaka
 Rahmatganj MFS, Dhaka
 Abahani Limited, Chittagong
 Arambagh KS, Dhaka
 Muktijoddha Sangsad KC, Dhaka
 Beanibazar SC, Sylhet
 Feni Soccer Club, Feni
 Narayanganj Suktara Sangsad, Narayanganj

Final standings

Season statistics

Top scorers

Goalscorers

References

Bangladesh Football Premier League seasons
Bangladesh
1
1